Girls' Generation-TTS (also known as TTS, TaeTiSeo, or Girls' Generation-TaeTiSeo) is the first sub-unit of South Korean girl group Girls' Generation, formed by SM Entertainment in 2012. It is composed of three Girls' Generation members: Taeyeon, Tiffany, and Seohyun. The sub-group has released three extended plays: Twinkle, Holler, and Dear Santa.

History
During the year 2012, South Korean girl group Girls' Generation went through an unannounced hiatus as the majority of the group's members were focusing on individual activities. Some acted in television dramas while others participated in various television programs. The subgroup TTS was born because members Taeyeon, Tiffany, and Seohyun wanted to carry on with their music activities. All three were hosts of the weekly music program Show! Music Core at the time. On April 19, 2012, SM Entertainment officially announced the formation of the subgroup and hinted at the possibility of other future subgroups, explaining, "the members of the unit [are rotated] according to the [unique] music and concept of each new subgroup album." Compared to Girls' Generation, TTS's main focus is on each member's vocal ability while the original group places more emphasis on the overall songs and uniform group performances. The name "TaeTiSeo" or "TTS", is made up of the first syllables of Taeyeon, Tiffany, and Seohyun.

Their debut EP, Twinkle, was released on April 30, 2012. It was the first album by a Korean artist to rank number 1 on the Billboard World Albums chart. At the time, it was also the highest charting K-pop album on the Billboard 200, reaching number 126. The title track of the same name sold 2,520,485 digital copies in South Korea as of July 2014, and the album has sold 155,521 copies in South Korea. TTS became the first subgroup to achieve a "triple crown" on South Korean music shows, reigning in the number 1 spot for three weeks in a row.

In September 2014, the group released their second EP, Holler, selling 87,513 copies. The album debuted at number 1 on South Korea's Gaon Album Chart and the Billboard World Albums chart. With this achievement, TTS become the third Korean artist, and the first female artist, to have more than one number 1 on the Billboard World Albums chart. During an interview with Billboard, the three singers shared, "This album was really personal for us and it was fun... to put out a much more raw side of our music... the music we put together has so much more layers, so much more depth to it in terms of sound, choruses or harmonizing together... Our main goal was to not be visually entertaining, but be vocally entertaining." They also revealed that Seohyun wrote the lyrics to one of the songs, "Only U", while Tiffany served as the visual director to the concept of "Holler" music video. During promotions, the three singers were featured in the reality show The TaeTiSeo. The show took on the personal side of Taeyeon, Tiffany and Seohyun, revealing how they live their normal everyday lives and what they do in their free time. Some footage of the album preparation was also shown.

In December 2015, TTS released their third EP, a Christmas special album titled Dear Santa. The album debuted at number 2 on South Korea's Gaon Albums Chart and has sold at least 60,456 copies to date. Seohyun wrote the lyrics to the title track "Dear Santa". As an effort to support music education for children in Asia, TTS contributed a part of the album's sales profits to a charity called "SMile for U", a campaign held between SM Entertainment and UNICEF.

Discography

Extended plays

Singles

Other charted songs

Filmography

Television

Music videos

Awards and nominations

Notes

References

External links

 
K-pop music groups
Musical groups established in 2012
SM Entertainment artists
South Korean dance music groups
South Korean girl groups
SM Town
2012 establishments in South Korea
Musical groups from Seoul
South Korean musical trios
Golden Disc Award winners
MAMA Award winners